Julian Edward George Asquith, 2nd Earl of Oxford and Asquith,  (22 April 1916 – 16 January 2011) was a British colonial administrator and hereditary peer.

Background and education
Asquith was the only son of Katharine (née Horner) and Raymond Asquith, a barrister. He was the grandson of H.H. Asquith, 1st Earl of Oxford and Asquith, British Prime Minister from 1908 until 1916. Lord Oxford's two older sisters both predeceased him; the younger of these was Lady Perdita Rose Mary Asquith, later Lady Hylton (1910–1996), who was married to William Jolliffe, 4th Baron Hylton and became the grandmother of the actress Anna Chancellor.

He inherited the earldom in 1928 on the death of his grandfather, since his father had been killed in the First World War. He was raised as a Roman Catholic after his mother's conversion to Catholicism in 1923. He and was educated at St Ronan's School and Ampleforth College, going on to study at Balliol College, Oxford, where he graduated with Bachelor of Arts and Master of Arts degrees. In 1936, he attended the opening of the new building of Campion Hall, a Catholic institution within the University, with the Duke of Alba, Spanish ambassador to London, and Alban Goodier S.J., the former Archbishop of Bombay.

In 1940, Asquith was commissioned in the Royal Engineers and served with 3 Field Squadron in Egypt. From 1942 to 1948 he was an Assistant District Commissioner in Palestine.

Career
After the war, Lord Oxford pursued a career in the Colonial Service. He was Deputy chairman Secretary of the British Administration Tripolitania from 1949 to 1950, Director of Interior Tripolitania in 1951 and Advisor to the Prime Minister of Libya in 1952. In 1955 he was Administrative Secretary of Zanzibar and from 1958 to 1962 was the Administrator of Saint Lucia. He was appointed Companion of the Order of St Michael and St George in 1961.

Oxford was the Governor and Commander-in-Chief of the Seychelles from 1962 to 1967, and the Commissioner of the British Indian Ocean Territory from 1965 to 1967. In 1964, he was advanced as Knight Commander of the Order of St Michael and St George. He also held the posts of Constitutional Commander of the Cayman Islands in 1971, and Turks and Caicos Islands from 1973 to 1974.

Marriage and children
On 28 August 1947, Lord Oxford married Anne Mary Celestine Palairet, daughter of Mary de Vere Studd and Sir Michael Palairet (1882–1956) at the Brompton Oratory. Anne Oxford was also a Roman Catholic via her parents' conversions.

Lord and Lady Oxford had five children: three daughters (the second of which is married to a diplomat) and two sons, both diplomats:

 Lady (Mary) Annunziata Asquith (born 28 July 1948), partner of Patrick Anson, 5th Earl of Lichfield
 Lady Katharine Rose Celestine Asquith (born 1 October 1949), in 1970 married Adam Ridley,  divorced 1976; married secondly 1985 Nathaniel Page, son of Sir John Page.<ref>Burke's Peerage, volume 2 (2003), p. 3,036</ref>  
 Raymond Benedict Bartholomew Asquith, 3rd Earl of Oxford and Asquith (born 24 August 1952)
 Lady Clare Perpetua Frances Asquith (born 28 March 1955)
 Sir Dominic Antony Gerard Asquith, KCMG (born 7 February 1957), a former British Ambassador to Iraq, Egypt and Libya.

Lord Oxford inherited the estate of Mells Manor from his mother Katharine Asquith, the younger daughter of Lady Frances (née Graham) and Sir John Horner, of Mells.

The Countess of Oxford and Asquith died in 1998. The Earl died, aged 94, on 16 January 2011. He was succeeded in his peerage titles, which he had held for over 80 years, by his elder son, Raymond (b. 1952), a former British diplomat and elected hereditary member of the House of Lords.

References

Sources
 Who's Who 2007 "Oxford and Asquith, The Earl of" and "Asquith, Dominic"
 "Obituary: The Countess of Oxford and Asquith", Daily Telegraph, 1998.
 John Joliffe. "Obituary: The Countess of Oxford and Asquith" The Independent'', 7 September 1998, available online.
 Burke's Peerage & Landed Gentry: Oxford and Asquith, full article only by subscription.

External links

1916 births
2011 deaths
Military personnel from Somerset
People educated at Ampleforth College
Alumni of Balliol College, Oxford
Governors of British Seychelles
Earls of Oxford and Asquith
Knights Commander of the Order of St Michael and St George
British Army personnel of World War II
Royal Engineers officers
English Roman Catholics
People from Somerset
Julian Asquith, 2nd Earl of Oxford and Asquith
British colonial governors and administrators in Africa
Sultanate of Zanzibar people
Governors of British Saint Lucia
British Indian Ocean Territory people
Turks and Caicos Islands people
Caymanian people
Oxford and Asquith